SABB may refer to:
SABB (Saudi bank) or Saudi British Bank, a subsidiary of HSBC  
SABB S.A., an Argentine rolling stock manufacturer.

Sabb may refer to:
Sabbatical officer or sabb, in UK students' unions
Sabb., an abbreviation related to the Moed
 Sabb Motor,  Norwegian company making small marine diesel engines

People with the surname
Dwayne Sabb (born 1969), American football player
Ronnie A. Sabb (born 1958), American politician from California